Borodino is a rural locality (a village) in Novoalexandrovskoye Rural Settlement, Suzdalsky District, Vladimir Oblast, Russia. The population was 24 as of 2010. There are 4 streets.

Geography 
Borodino is located 44 km southwest of Suzdal (the district's administrative centre) by road. Zeleni is the nearest rural locality.

References 

Rural localities in Suzdalsky District